Karl Richard Benjamin Schlossmann (19 February 1885 Puurmani Parish (now Põltsamaa Parish, Kreis Dorpat – 17 December 1969 Stockholm) was an Estonian microbiologist. He was a member of Estonian National Assembly.

References

1885 births
1969 deaths
People from Põltsamaa Parish
People from Kreis Dorpat
Members of the Estonian National Assembly
Estonian microbiologists
University of Tartu alumni
Academic staff of the University of Tartu
Estonian World War II refugees
Estonian emigrants to Sweden